Abdulrahman Taiwo (born 5 August 1998) is a Nigerian professional footballer who plays as a centre-forward for  Spartak Trnava, on loan from Sønderjyske.

Club career
Taiwo played in Nigeria with Abees Academy Abuja and Kwara United. In 2017, he had a nine-month stint with Turkish club Bursaspor, which preceded a move to FC Zbrojovka Brno of the Czech First League in September 2017. In January 2018, Taiwo completed a transfer to Slovakia to join Nitra. He scored five goals in pre-season for Nitra, notably netting braces against ex-team FC Zbrojovka Brno and MTK Budapest respectively. He made his debut on 28 July in the Slovak Super Liga, featuring for the full duration of a 2–1 loss against Žilina. Taiwo's first competitive goal came in August versus Slovan Bratislava.

In January 2019, Taiwo moved across Slovakia to DAC Dunajská Streda. A year later, after six goals for DAC, Taiwo returned to the Czech First League on loan with Karviná. He scored on debut versus Zlín on 15 February 2020.

On 19 August 2021, Taiwo joined Danish Superliga club Sønderjyske on a deal until June 2025. On 5 September 2022, it emerged that a rift had arisen between the management of SønderjyskE and Taiwo. As a result, he was sent down to the U19 team, but that decision didn't have the support of the first-team squad. Shortly after, he was back in the first team squad. On 6 September 2022, the club confirmed that Taiwo had left the club to join Slovak side FC Spartak Trnava on a loan deal for the 2022-23 season.

International career
In June 2016, Taiwo was selected for the Nigeria U23s' provisional squad ahead of the 2016 Summer Olympics. However, he wasn't picked in Samson Siasia's final selection. Taiwo did represent the U23s at the 2016 Suwon Invitational Tournament a month prior.

Career statistics
.

References

External links

1998 births
Living people
Place of birth missing (living people)
Nigerian footballers
Nigeria youth international footballers
Nigerian expatriate footballers
Association football forwards
Kwara United F.C. players
Bursaspor footballers
FC Zbrojovka Brno players
FC Nitra players
FC DAC 1904 Dunajská Streda players
MFK Karviná players
MFK Zemplín Michalovce players
SønderjyskE Fodbold players
FC Spartak Trnava players
Slovak Super Liga players
Czech First League players
Danish Superliga players
Expatriate footballers in Turkey
Expatriate footballers in the Czech Republic
Expatriate footballers in Slovakia
Expatriate men's footballers in Denmark
Nigerian expatriate sportspeople in Turkey
Nigerian expatriate sportspeople in the Czech Republic
Nigerian expatriate sportspeople in Slovakia
Nigerian expatriate sportspeople in Denmark